Ochsenheimeria lovyi is a moth of the family Ypsolophidae. It is found in Tunisia.

The larvae feed on Juncus maritimus.

References

Moths described in 1930
Ypsolophidae
Endemic fauna of Tunisia
Moths of Africa